Ralph Alessi (born March 5, 1963) is an American jazz trumpeter, composer, and ECM recording artist. Alessi is known as a virtuosic performer whose critically-acclaimed projects include his Baida Quartet, with Jason Moran, Drew Gress, and Nasheet Waits, and This Against That, his quintet with Andy Milne, Gress, Mark Ferber, and Ravi Coltrane. Alessi has also recorded and performed with artists including Steve Coleman, Uri Caine, Fred Hersch, and Don Byron.

Alessi is known for his work as an educator, and in 2001 he founded the School for Improvisational Music in Brooklyn, New York. He has taught at the Eastman School of Music, NYU, NEC, the University of Nevada, Reno, Siena Jazz University, and University of the Arts Bern.

Early life and career 

Alessi was born and raised in the San Francisco Bay Area. His parents met as performers at the Metropolitan Opera: his mother, Maria Leone Alessi, sang in the chorus; his father, Joseph Alessi Sr., was principal trumpet for nearly 15 seasons. His brother, Joseph Alessi, is a trombonist with the New York Philharmonic.

Alessi also began as a classical musician, and performed with the San Francisco Symphony and San Francisco Opera in his teens. He later attended the California Institute of the Arts, studying with Charlie Haden while earning a BFA in jazz trumpet performance and MFA in jazz bass performance. In 1986, he met fellow CalArts student Ravi Coltrane, who became one of his longest-standing collaborators. JazzTimes describes their "musical bond" as "arguably developing into a rapport on par with the highest echelon of trumpet/tenor combinations"; Coltrane once gave an interview with NPR focused entirely on his favorite song, Alessi's "Who Wants Ice Cream".

Select discography

 Hissy Fit (1999, Love Slave)
 This Against That (2002, RKM)
 Vice & Virtue (2002, RKM)
 Look (2007, Between the Lines)
 Open Season (2009, RKM)
 Cognitive Dissonance (2010, CAM Jazz)
 Wiry Strong (2011, Clean Feed)
 Only Many (2013, CAM Jazz)
 Baida with Jason Moran, Drew Gress, Nasheet Waits (2013, ECM)
 Quiver (2016, ECM)
 Imaginary Friends with Ravi Coltrane, Andy Milne, Drew Gress, Mark Ferber (2018, ECM)

As sideman
With David Ake
 Bridges (Posi-Tone, 2013)
 Humanities (Posi-Tone, 2018)
With Don Byron
 You are #6 (Blue Note, 2001)
 Ivey Divey (Blue Note, 2006)
With Michael Cain
 Circa (ECM, 1996)
With Uri Caine
 The Sidewalks of New York: Tin Pan Alley (Winter & Winter, 1999)
 Gustav Mahler in Toblach (Winter & Winter, 1999)
 The Goldberg Variations (Winter & Winter, 2000)
 Gustav Mahler: Dark Flame (Winter & Winter, 2003)
 Shelf-Life (Winter & Winter, 2005)
 Uri Caine Ensemble Plays Mozart (Winter & Winter, 2006)
 The Othello Syndrome (Winter & Winter, 2009)
 Rhapsody in Blue (Winter & Winter, 2013)
With James Carney
 Fables from the Aqueduct (1994, Jacaranda)
 Offset Rhapsody (1997, Jacaranda)
 Ways & Means (2009, Songlines)
With Steve Coleman
 A Tale of 3 Cities (Novus/BMG, 1994)
 Myths, Modes, and Means (Novus/BMG, 1995)
 The Way of the Cipher (Novus/BMG, 1995)
 The Sign and the Seal (BMG, 1996)
 Genesis (BMG, 1997)
 The Sonic Language of Myth (BMG, 1999) 
 Lucidarium  (Label Bleu, 2003)
With Ravi Coltrane
Moving Pictures (RCA/BMG, 1998)
From the Round Box (RCA, 2000)
Spirit Fiction (Blue Note, 2012)
With Scott Colley
Architect of the Silent Moment (CAM Jazz, 2005 [2007])
Empire (CAM Jazz, 2010)
With David Gilmore
 Ritualism (2000, Kashka)
With Drew Gress
 7 Black Butterflies (Premonition, Koch, 2005)
 The Irrational Numbers (Premonition, 2007)
 The Sky Inside (Pirouet, 2013)
With Fred Hersch
 Leaves of Grass (2005, Palmetto)
 Live from the Jazz Standard/ Fred Hersch Pocket Orchestra (2009, Palmetto)
 Trio plus 2 (Palmetto)
 Songs Without Words (2009, Nonesuch)
With Jason Moran
Artist in Residence (Blue Note, 2006)
With Enrico Pieranunzi
 Proximity (2015, CamJazz)
With Lonnie Plaxico
 With All My Heart (1994, Muse)
 Emergence (2000, Savoy)
With Sam Rivers
 Inspiration (1999, RCA)
 Culmination (1999, BMG France/RCA)
With Yelena Eckemoff
 Better Than Gold and Silver (2018, L&H)
 I Am a Stranger in This World (2022, L&H)

With Others
 Peter Epstein, Polarities (2014)
 Tomas Fujiwara Trio, Variable Bets (Relative Pitch, 2014)
 Florian Weber, Lucent Waters (ECM, 2018)

References

Jazz trumpeters
Composers from San Francisco
Living people
Avant-garde jazz trumpeters
1963 births
American trumpeters
American male trumpeters
American jazz composers
American male jazz composers
Jazz musicians from San Francisco
21st-century trumpeters
21st-century American male musicians